Phyllonorycter insignis is a moth of the family Gracillariidae. It is known from California and Maine in the United States.

The wingspan is about 9 mm.

The larvae feed on Erechtites species and Ceanothus integerrimus. They mine the leaves of their host plant. The mine is found on the underside of the leaf, occupying a comparatively small area in which the leaf substance is almost entirely eaten out. The lower epidermis is closely wrinkled at maturity.

References

insignis
Moths of North America
Moths described in 1889